Scipio the African is a 1971 Italian comedy film directed by Luigi Magni.

Plot
Years after the Second Punic War, Scipio Africanus finds himself generally unliked, despite his defeat of Hannibal, many years earlier. He and his brother, Scipio Asiaticus, are accused by Marcus Porcius Cato of the theft of 500 talents intended for Rome. As his friends and loved ones abandon him, Scipio finds life after war not as easy as he thought it would be.

Cast
 Marcello Mastroianni as Scipione l'Africano
 Silvana Mangano as Emilia
 Vittorio Gassman as Catone il Censore
 Ruggero Mastroianni as Scipione l'Asiatico
 Turi Ferro as Giove Capitolino
 Woody Strode as Massinissa
 Fosco Giachetti as Aulio Gellio 
 Ben Ekland
 Enzo Fiermonte
 Philippe Hersent
 Gianni Solaro

References

External links

1971 films
1970s historical comedy films
1970s Italian-language films
Italian historical comedy films
Films directed by Luigi Magni
Commedia all'italiana
Second Punic War films
Cultural depictions of Scipio Africanus
1970s Italian films